Roxanne Ashley Yu is a Filipino swimmer who represents the Philippines.

Swimming career 
Yu would win three bronze medals in the 2015 Southeast Asian Games in Singapore. Her three bronze medals came in the 100 m backstroke, the 200 m backstroke, and the 4 x 100 m medley relay, where she teamed up with Hannah Dato, Imelda Corazon Wistey, and 2012 Olympian Jasmine Alkhaldi to a medal finish with a new national record of 4:16.19. Yu would also compete in the 50 m backstroke and the 4 x 100 m freestyle relay, but failed to qualify for the final in the former and finishing 4th in the latter.

References

1997 births
Living people
Filipino female swimmers
Sportspeople from Manila
Female backstroke swimmers
Swimmers at the 2018 Asian Games
Southeast Asian Games medalists in swimming
Southeast Asian Games bronze medalists for the Philippines
Competitors at the 2015 Southeast Asian Games
Competitors at the 2017 Southeast Asian Games
Asian Games competitors for the Philippines